Almon D. Cornwell (March 30, 1820November 8, 1893) was an American farmer, politician, and Wisconsin pioneer.  He was a member of the Wisconsin State Assembly, representing Kenosha County in the 1858 session.

Biography
Almon D. Cornwell was born March 30, 1820, in Greenfield, New York.  He was educated in the common schools in New York, and then taught school for two terms.

He moved west in 1844, accompanied by his father-in-law, William Tichnor, and bought land in the town of Salem, in what is now Kenosha County, Wisconsin.  He gradually expanded his estate from 80 acres to 600 acres.  He served as chairman of the town of Salem and, in 1857, he was elected to the Wisconsin State Assembly, representing western Kenosha County.  He served in the 11th Wisconsin Legislature.

Cornwell died of a stroke at his home in Salem, on November 8, 1893.

Personal life and family

Almon Cornwell married Cordelia Tichnor in Cayuga County, New York, on June 13, 1841.  They had at least nine children, though one died in infancy.  Their eldest son Charles was drafted into the Union Army at age 18 and died of dysentery at Nashville, Tennessee, just a few months before the end of the war.

References

External links
 

1820 births
1893 deaths
People from Greenfield, New York
People from Salem Lakes, Wisconsin
Farmers from Wisconsin
Republican Party members of the Wisconsin State Assembly
19th-century American politicians